Richard Leroy Teed (March 8, 1926 – August 17, 2014) was an American professional baseball player, manager and scout. A catcher by trade, his playing career extended for 17 seasons between 1947 and 1965, with one-year interruptions in 1956 and 1964. However, he appeared in only one game and received a single at bat in Major League Baseball as a member of the  Brooklyn Dodgers when, as a pinch hitter, he struck out. 

Teed was a native of Springfield, Massachusetts, and graduated from high school in Windsor, Connecticut. He served in the United States Marine Corps during World War II in the Pacific Theater prior to his baseball career.

The 1953 season was his seventh in the Brooklyn organization and was spent mainly with the Mobile Bears of the Double-A Southern Association. His one-game MLB appearance happened July 24 at Ebbets Field when he batted for pitcher Jim Hughes in the seventh inning and struck out against Max Surkont of the Milwaukee Braves; Brooklyn was trailing 11–1 at the time. The Braves eventually won, 11–6.

Teed became a manager in the Philadelphia Phillies' minor league system at the Class A level in the mid-1960s and later scouted for them and the Dodgers, by then in Los Angeles. He died in Newport, Rhode Island, at age 88 on August 17, 2014.

References

External links

Obituary

1926 births
2014 deaths
Arkansas Travelers players
Bakersfield Bears players
Baseball players from Massachusetts
Brooklyn Dodgers players
Buffalo Bisons (minor league) players
Chattanooga Lookouts players
Danville Dodgers players
Los Angeles Angels (minor league) players
Los Angeles Dodgers scouts
Miami Marlins (FSL) players
Minor league baseball managers
Mobile Bears players
Montreal Royals players
Thomasville Dodgers players
Philadelphia Phillies scouts
Pueblo Dodgers players
Rochester Red Wings players
St. Paul Saints (AA) players
United States Marines
Williamsport Grays players